"Captain Nemo" is the debut single by Swedish band Dive (Chris Lancelot and Erik Holmberg), released in 1990. The song is named after the legendary character Captain Nemo from the novel 20,000 Leagues Under the Sea.

Sarah Brightman version

"Captain Nemo" is the first single from British soprano Sarah Brightman's album, Dive. A music video was made for the song.

Critical reception
Music & Media commented in their review, "Mostly she's featured in Andrew Lloyd Webber-composed musicals; now you have to judge her on her own merits. At least as interesting as Kate Bush and Tori Amos."

Track listing
"Captain Nemo (Radio edit)"
"When it Rains in America"
"Island"
"Captain Nemo" (Extended album version)

Alternate 2-track edition
"Captain Nemo (Radio Edit)"
"Island (LP Version)"

Other covers
Cecilia Vennersten recorded a Swedish version of the song on her self-titled 1995 debut album.

References

1992 singles
1993 singles
Sarah Brightman songs
Works based on Twenty Thousand Leagues Under the Sea
1990 songs
Song recordings produced by Frank Peterson
A&M Records singles
Music based on works by Jules Verne
Music videos directed by Howard Greenhalgh